Lourdes School Quezon City (LSQC) is a private, Catholic basic education institution run by the  Order of Friars Minor Capuchin in Quezon City, Philippines. It is located beside the National Shrine of Our Lady of Lourdes. It was founded by the Capuchins in 1955 and named Lourdes Catholic School. The name was changed to Lourdes School Quezon City to distinguish it from the then newly established Lourdes School of Mandaluyong. LSQC started operation with 11 teachers and with Fr. Jesus de Ansoain as its first rector and principal.

Students and alumni of the school are called "Lourdesians" or "Lourdesiano" in Filipino.

The school is named after and devoted to Our Lady of Lourdes, and is under the patronage of St. Francis of Assisi.

History
After World War II destroyed the original church dedicated to Our Lady of Lourdes, the Capuchins built a new church in Quezon City in 1950. Four years later, Rev. Fr. Adolfo De Echavarri, superior of the Capuchins in the Philippines, along with other fellow Capuchins, conceptualized the creation of Catholic schools for evangelizing the communities entrusted to them.

In 1955, the school was established. It was built beside the then newly constructed Lourdes Church which is now a National Shrine. As the population of students increased, a fourth floor, which now holds the rooms for grade 6 students, was added to the original building. A new building was later constructed in May 1967 for the high school department of the school. LSQC, along with other Capuchin schools in Metro Manila formed the first Inter-Capuchin Schools Athletic and Academic Meet in 1984.

The Capuchins started a Financial Assistance Program (FAP) in 1970 wherein discounts in tuition were given to students.

The high school department received its first accreditation by the PAASCU in 1992, and the grade school department in 1997. The high school department was granted a level 3 accreditation in 2007, and was once again given the same level re-accredited status in 2012. 

A new five-story building for the high school campus was erected in 1997. Today, the five-story building holds the classrooms for grades 7 and 8 including rooms of laboratories. Since school year 1978-1979, female students were accepted to enroll in the school.

In 2015, the school celebrated its 60th founding anniversary. On this year, the construction of the Blessed Jose Maria de Manila Courtyard was completed.

School program
Lourdes School Quezon City offers four levels of education, namely:

Senior high school (Grades 11 and 12) 
Junior high school (Grades 7 to 10)
Grade school (Grades 1 to 6)
Preschool (Pre-kinder and kindergarten)

Historically, LSQC was an exclusive school for boys across all levels; however, in the late 1970s, the high school department began admitting girl scholars. Its high school eventually became coeducational in 1998.

The senior high school program offers all four strands under the Academic Track, namely:

General Academic (G.A.)
 Science, Technology, Engineering and Mathematics (S.T.E.M.)
 Accountancy Business and Management (A.B.M.)
 Humanities and Social Sciences (HUMSS)

Aside from its academic program, a financial assistance program is offered to academically-competent children from low-income families.

Official seal
The primary features of the school's seal are the three small crosses on the left and right sides of the logo, two arms in saltire position with a cloud as a background.

The Three crosses symbolizes the Holy Trinity, a primary focus of Franciscan spirituality. The bare arm is of Jesus Christ' who is believed in Christianity to have given his own life for humanity's salvation while the sleeved arm is of St. Francis of Assisi who, due to his saintly life according to Christ's own life and teachings in the Gospel, earned the title as the “Mirror of Christ”. The big cross signifies the concept of "Becoming like Christ", which is a way of life striven for by Franciscans. The clouds represent heaven which in Christianity  is the destiny and home of mankind in the afterlife. The school's logo features the motto "Pax Et Bonum", a traditional Franciscan greeting which means "Peace and goodwill" or "Peace and the good" (often imprecisely translated as "Peace and all good". Note that the word "all", in any of its Latin translations, does not appear in the phrase).

The seal is prominently displayed on the school's uniforms, official bus, façade, and the skywalk which connects the grade school and the high school departments.

Accreditation
The school is accredited by the PAASCU. Both the grade school and high school departments are granted a level 3 status, the highest level for accreditation, thus joining a small circle of less than fifteen schools in Metro Manila accredited with such status.

Gallery

External links

Lourdes School Quezon City's Alumni Association
LSQC USA Alumni Association

References

Catholic elementary schools in Metro Manila
Catholic secondary schools in Metro Manila
Schools in Quezon City
Capuchin schools